Monte Ripalta is a mountain in Campania, Italy.

Mountains of Campania
Mountains of the Apennines